The Morning Journal is a daily newspaper based in Lorain, Ohio.  Originally the Lorain Journal, it was an afternoon paper which was historically more popular in an industrial town like Lorain, but switched to morning publication in the 1980s.

It is the primary paper in the city of Lorain, but also serves the wider area of Lorain, Erie, and Huron counties, and the western Cleveland suburbs.

See also 
 Lorain Journal Co. v. United States of 1951
 Milkovich v. Lorain Journal Co. of 1990

References

External links
The Morning Journal Website

Newspapers published in Ohio
21st Century Media publications
Lorain County, Ohio
Lorain, Ohio